Faristenia quercivora is a moth in the family Gelechiidae. It is found in the Russian Far East, Korea and Japan (Honshu).

The wingspan is 13.5–17 mm. The forewings are pale brownish grey, speckled with creamy white scales and with several irregularly scattered dark fuscous streaks. The hindwings are pale grey.

The larvae feed on Quercus mongolica.

References

Faristenia
Moths described in 1991